Edgaras Venckaitis (born 12 December 1985 in Tauragė) is a Lithuanian wrestler, who competes in the men's 66 kg Greco-Roman division.

He has competed at the 2012 Summer Olympics where he finished 7th. He lost to eventual champion Kim Hyeon-woo in the main draw and then to Pedro Mulens in the repechage.  In 2014 Venckaitis won the bronze medal at the World Championships.

References

External links
 

Lithuanian male sport wrestlers
1985 births
Living people
People from Tauragė
Sportspeople from Vilnius
Wrestlers at the 2012 Summer Olympics
Wrestlers at the 2016 Summer Olympics
Olympic wrestlers of Lithuania
World Wrestling Championships medalists
21st-century Lithuanian people